Bagheera Fountain is a 1939 fountain by Lilian Swann Saarinen, installed in Boston's Public Garden, in the U.S. state of Massachusetts.

Description and history
Inspired by Rudyard Kipling's The Jungle Book (1894), the fountain features a bronze sculpture of a mountain lion and owl, measuring approximately 32 x 16 x 16 in. The statue rests on a polished granite base that is approximately 57 in. tall and has a diameter of 60 in. The fountain was surveyed as part of the Smithsonian Institution's "Save Outdoor Sculpture!" program in 1993.

See also

 1939 in art

References

External links
 

1939 sculptures
Boston Public Garden
Bronze sculptures in Massachusetts
Cats in art
Fountains in Massachusetts
Granite sculptures in Massachusetts
Outdoor sculptures in Boston
Sculptures of birds in the United States
Statues in Boston
Statues of fictional characters
Works based on The Jungle Book